Edward Peter Keher (born 14 October 1941) is an Irish former hurler who played as a centre-forward at senior level for the Kilkenny county team.

Born in Inistioge, County Kilkenny, Keher first played competitive hurling whilst at school in St. Kieran's College. He arrived on the inter-county scene at the age of fifteen when he first linked up with the Kilkenny minor team. He made his senior debut in the 1959 championship. Keher went on to play a key part for Kilkenny over several seasons, and won six All-Ireland medals, ten Leinster medals and three National Hurling League medals. An All-Ireland runner-up on four occasions, Keher also captained the team to All-Ireland victory in 1969.

As a member of the Leinster inter-provincial team for sixteen years, Keher won nine Railway Cup medals, a record for a Leinster player. At club level he won one championship medal with Rower–Inistioge.

Keher's career tally of 35 goals and 336 points was a record score which stood until 20 June 2010 when it was surpassed by Henry Shefflin.

Throughout his career Keher made 50 championship appearances, a Kilkenny record which stood until 25 July 2004 when it was surpassed by D. J. Carey. His retirement came following the conclusion of the 1977 championship.

In retirement from playing, Keher temporarily became involved in team management and coaching. As joint-coach to the Kilkenny senior team with Pat Henderson, he helped guide the team to the All-Ireland title in 1979.

During his playing days, Keher won four Cú Chulainn awards and five All-Star awards, as well as being named Texaco Hurler of the Year in 1972. He also  met and tutored Muhammad Ali in hurling in 1972, when he visited Dublin.  He has been repeatedly voted onto teams made up of the sport's greats, including at corner-forward on the Hurling Team of the Century in 1984 and the Hurling Team of the Millennium in 2000.

Playing career

Colleges

Keher attended the famous St. Kieran's College in Kilkenny, a virtual nursery for young hurling talent.

In 1957 he was just fifteen years-old when he played a key part for the college in the provincial championship. A 6–3 to 3–0 defeat of Patrician College, Ballyfin gave Keher his first Leinster medal. The subsequent All-Ireland decider on 28 April 1957 saw St. Kieran's line out against St. Flannan's College, Ennis. Keher scored three goals in the second half to clinch victory, before setting up a fourth goal in a narrow 4–2 to 2–7 victory. It was his first All-Ireland medal.

St. Kieran's continued their dominance in 1958, with Keher adding a second Leinster medal to his collection following a 10–4 to 3–4 thrashing of Cistercian College, Roscrea.

In 1959 Keher was captain of the team. He won a third Leinster medal to his collection that year, after receiving a walkover in the final, before later lining out in the All-Ireland final on 19 April 1959.  Abbey CBS, Tipperary provided the opposition, however, a 2–13 to 4–2 victory gave Keher a second All-Ireland medal, while he also had the honour of lifting the Croke Cup as captain.

Club

Keher played his club hurling with Rower–Inistioge and enjoyed much success.

In 1968 he lined out in his first senior championship decider. Three-in-a-row hopefuls Bennettsbridge provided the opposition and a close game followed. A narrow 3–9 to 3–7 victory gave Keher a Kilkenny Senior Hurling Championship medal.

Minor

Keher was just fifteen years-old when he was called up to the Kilkenny minor team in 1956. He won a Leinster medal as an unused substitute that year following a 4–7 to 3–7 defeat of Wexford.

In 1957 Keher added a second Leinster medal to his collection, as Offaly were defeated by 5–10 to 4–2. The subsequent All-Ireland final against Tipperary was a replay of the previous year, however, the game was much closer. Kilkenny were defeated once again, however, on a score line of 4–7 to 3–7.

Kilkenny retained their provincial crown in 1958, with Keher collecting a third Leinster medal following a 5–11 to 1–7 defeat of Laois.

Keher lined out for a fourth and final year in the minor grade in 1959. A 7–9 to 3–4 trouncing of Wexford gave him a fourth successive Leinster medal. He later lined out in a third All-Ireland final, with old rivals Tipperary providing the opposition once again. A narrow 2–8 to 2–7 defeat denied Keher an All-Ireland medal once again, in what was his last game in the minor grade.

Senior

1959–1964

After impressing against Dublin in the Oireachtas Cup and Wexford in the Walsh Cup, Keher was included on the Kilkenny senior panel for the replay of the All-Ireland final against Waterford on 4 October 1959. After fifteen minutes he was introduced as a substitute for Johnny McGovern, who was forced off after a recurrence of a shoulder injury he'd picked up in the drawn game. Kilkenny took an early six-point lead, however, two goals from Tom Cheasty and a third from Mick Flannelly gave Waterford a half-time lead. Kilkenny scored only two points in the second half, courtesy of Keher, and eventually succumbed to a 3–12 to 1–10 defeat.

In 1962 Keher was a regular member of the starting fifteen, and captured his first silverware when Kilkenny defeated Cork to take their first National Hurling League in almost thirty years.

The following year Keher won his first Leinster medal following a 2–10 to 0–9 defeat of Dublin. This victory allowed Kilkenny to advance directly into an All-Ireland showdown with Waterford on 1 September 1963. "The Cats" entered the game as underdogs, however, Keher proved to be the difference with a magnificent display in which he scored fourteen points. Despite a hat-trick of goals from Waterford's Séamus Power, Kilkenny secured a 4–17 to 6–8 victory. It was Keher's first All-Ireland medal. He later won his first Cú Chulainn award in the inaugural year of the awards scheme.

Keher added a second Leinster medal to his collection in 1964 as Dublin were defeated on a 4–11 to 1–8 score line. The All-Ireland final on 6 September 1964 saw Kilkenny enter the game as firm favourites against fierce rivals Tipperary. John McKenna scored Tipp's first goal after ten minutes as the Munster champions took a 1–8 to 0–6 interval lead. The second half saw Tipperary score goals for fun, with Donie Nealon getting a hat-trick and Seán McLoughlin another. Kilkenny were humiliated at the full-time whistle as Tipperary triumphed by 5–13 to 2–8. In spite of this defeat Keher later collected a second Cú Chulainn award.

1965–1970

After surrendering their provincial crown in 1965, Kilkenny bounced back the following year by reaching the National league decider. An aggregate 10–15 to 2–15 defeat of New York gave Keher his second National League medal. He later won a third Leinster medal following a 1–15 to 2–6 defeat of Wexford. The subsequent All-Ireland final on 4 September 1966 pitted Kilkenny against Cork for the first time in nineteen years. Kilkenny were the favourites, however, two goals by Colm Sheehan and a third from John O'Halloran gave Cork a merited 3–9 to 1–10 victory. Keher later won a third Cú Chulainn award.

Kilkenny retained their provincial crown in 1967, with Keher adding a fourth Leinster medal to his collection following a 4–10 to 1–12 defeat of Wexford after a scare in the opening half. 3 September 1967 saw Kilkenny face Tipperary in the All-Ireland decider. Tipp looked like continuing their hoodoo over their near rivals as they took a 2–6 to 1–3 lead at half-time. Goalkeeper Ollie Walsh was the hero for Kilkenny as he made a series of spectacular saves, however, the team lost Keher and Tom Walsh to injury in the second half. In spite of this, Kilkenny laid to rest a bogey that Tipperary had over the team since 1922, and a 3–8 to 2–7 victory gave Keher a second All-Ireland medal. He later won a fourth Cú Chulainn award.

Wexford put an end to Kilkenny's hopes of retaining the title in 1968, however, the Noresiders bounced back the following year with Keher, who was now captain of the side, collecting a fifth Leinster medal following a 3–9 to 0–16 defeat of Offaly. 7 September 1969 saw Kilkenny face Cork in the All-Ireland decider. The Leesiders got into their stride following an early goal by Charlie McCarthy and led by six points coming up to half time when Kilkenny raised a green flag themselves. Kilkenny upped their performance after the interval and ran out winners on a 2–15 to 2–9 scoreline. The victory gave Keher a third All-Ireland medal, while he also had the honour of collecting the Liam MacCarthy Cup as captain.

1971–1977

After surrendering their provincial and All-Ireland crowns to Wexford the following year, Kilkenny began their complete dominance of the provincial championship in 1971. A 6–16 to 3–16 defeat of Wexford gave Keher his sixth Leinster medal. On 5 September 1971 Kilkenny faced Tipperary in the All-Ireland final, the first to be broadcast in colour by Telefís Éireann and the only eighty-minute meeting between the two sides. Kilkenny's ever-dependable goalkeeper, Ollie Walsh, had a nightmare of a game in which he conceded five goals, one of which passed through his legs, while that year's Hurler of the Year, "Babs" Keating, played out the closing stages of the game in his bare feet. Keher set a new record by scoring 2–11, however, it wasn't enough as Tipperary emerged the victors on a score line of 5–17 to 5–14. In spite of this defeat, Keher was later chosen on the inaugural All-Stars team.

In 1972 Keher won a seventh Leinster medal following a thrilling draw and replay victory over Wexford. Once again, Cork provided the opposition in the All-Ireland final on 3 September 1972, a game which is often considered to be one of the classic games of the modern era. Halfway through the second-half Cork were on form and stretched their lead to eight points. Drastic action was required for Kilkenny and Keher was deployed closer to the Cork goal. One of the most abiding memories of that game is of Keher grabbing the sliotar out of the sky and racing up the wing in the shadow of the Hogan Stand. From that sideline position Keher pucked the sliotar as if going for a point, however, the sliotar dropped short, deceiving Cork goalkeeper Paddy Barry, and ending up in the back of the net. After scoring that goal an almost emotionless Keher simply turned around to go back to his normal playing position with blood pouring out of a cut over his eye, having been hit by Tony Maher's hurley. Keher finished the game with a tally of 2–9 and collected his fourth All-Ireland medal following a remarkable 3–24 to 5–11 victory. As well as collecting a second All-Star award, Keher was an automatic choice for Texaco Hurler of the Year.

Keher added an eighth Leinster medal to his collection following a 4–22 to 3–15 defeat of Wexford. His season later came to a premature end due to injury, and he missed Kilkenny's All-Ireland defeat by Limerick. In spite of missing the latter stages of the championship, Keher collected a third All-Star award.

Wexford were, once again, narrowly defeated by Kilkenny in the 1974 provincial decider. The remarkable 6–13 to 2–24 victory gave Keher a ninth Leinster medal. In a repeat of the previous year Limerick provided the opposition in the subsequent All-Ireland final on 1 September 1974. The Munster champions stormed to a five-point lead in the first eleven minutes, however, a converted penalty by Keher, supplemented by two further goals gave Kilkenny a 3–19 to 1–13 victory and gave Keher a fifth All-Ireland medal. He later won a fourth All-Star award.

Kilkenny made it five successive provincial titles in-a-row in 1975. The 2–20 to 2–14 defeat of Wexford gave Keher his tenth Leinster medal. On 7 September 1975, Keher lined out in an impressive tenth All-Ireland final, with surprise semi-final winners Galway providing the opposition. Playing with the wind in the first half, Galway found themselves ahead by 0–9 to 1–3 at the interval. Keher's huge tally of 2–7 kept Galway at bay giving Kilkenny a 2–22 to 2–10 victory. Keher had once again powered his team to an All-Ireland victory, his sixth overall. He later added a fifth successive All-Star award to his collection.

In 1976 Kilkenny looked a sure bet to capture a third successive All-Ireland crown. The season began well with Keher winning a third National League medal following a 6–14 to 1–14 trouncing of Clare in a replay. Kilkenny's championship ambitions unravelled in spectacular fashion in the subsequent provincial campaign, when a 2–20 to 1–6 trouncing by Wexford dumped Keher's team out of the championship.

Keher played his last championship game for Kilkenny on 24 July 1977. The narrow 3–17 to 3–14 defeat by Wexford in the Leinster decider brought Kilkenny's championship to an end.

Inter-provincial

Keher also lind out with Leinster in the inter-provincial series of games, and enjoyed much success during a seventeen-year career.

After making his debut in 1961, it would take another three years before Keher enjoyed any success. A 3–7 to 2–9 defeat of archrivals Munster gave him a Railway Cup medal. Leinster made it two-in-a-row the following year, with Keher collecting a second Railway Cup medal following a 3–11 to 0–9 defeat of Munster.

Three-in-a-row proved beyond Leinster, however, Keher won a third Railway Cup medal in 1967 following a 2–14 to 3–5 defeat of Munster once again.

After several years of Munster dominance, Leinster bounced back in 1971. The team went on to secure five consecutive Railway Cup victories over Munster. Keher played a key role in all of these wins, and ended his career with nine Railway Cup medals, a record for a Leinster player.

Managerial career

In retirement from playing Keher became involved in team management and coaching.

He teamed up with Pat Henderson to take charge of the Kilkenny senior hurling team in 1979. It was a successful year for the duo as Kilkenny qualified for the provincial decider. A 2–21 to 2–17 defeat of Wexford secured the Leinster crown. Galway provided the opposition in the subsequent All-Ireland final on 2 September 1979, however, the game turned out to be one of the least exciting finals of the decade. A goal by Noel Lane after forty-seven minutes gave Galway a two-point lead, however, Galway failed to score for the rest of the game. Kilkenny, on the other hand, scored two long-range goals to secure a 2–12 to 1–8 victory. This victory gave Keher and Henderson All-Ireland victories as both players and as coaches.

In 1987 Keher took charge of the Kilkenny team on his own for one season. It was an unsuccessful period as Kilkenny exited the provincial championship at an early stage.

Controversy

In 2010 Keher was highly critical of Cork goalkeeper Donal Óg Cusack's autobiography, Come What May. After taking umbrage to the description of the Kilkenny team as the Stepford Wives of hurling, Keher insisted that Cusack's criticisms were unjustified and stated that if he had received a present of the best-seller last Christmas, it would have gone "straight in the bin."

Following the drawn All-Ireland final between Kilkenny and Galway in 2012, Keher became involved in a war-of-words with Joe Canning following his comments about Herny Shefflin's sportsmanship. Keher said, "I think that's a very disappointing comment to make about probably one of the greatest hurlers to ever play the game, and a thorough gentleman at that. We'd hate in Kilkenny to have someone of the stature of Joe Canning making a remark like that".

Recognition

Fr. Tommy Maher, trainer of seven All-Ireland-winning Kilkenny teams, said of him in 1975: "At this stage, I must say Eddie Keher is the greatest I've seen. The second greatest was Christy Ring. Up until last year, perhaps, I would have reversed that order. But I have no doubt at all now, because Keher has done so much for the game, has played it so brilliantly, scores so brilliantly and at all times then a thorough gentleman – a credit to the game.'.

Seven years after his retirement from playing, Keher received the ultimate honour during the GAA's centenary year in 1984 when he was chosen at left corner-forward on the Hurling Team of the Century. He was one of only a handful of players from the "modern era" to be listed on the team. Keher swapped to the right corner-forward position on the Hurling Team of the Millennium in 2000, while he was also named on a special Kilkenny Team of the Century.

In 2005 Keher was inducted into the Irish Independent/Jury's Ballsbridge Hotel Hall of Fame.

The following year Keher received an honorary doctorate of science from the University of Limerick. The university marked "the achievement of this remarkable hurling legend who is also well-known for his work with young people and in humanitarian causes."

Nearly forty years after winning the Texaco Hurler of the Year award, Keher was the recipient of the 2009 Texaco Sportstars Hall of Fame Award.

In May 2020, the Irish Independent named Keher at number four in its "Top 20 hurlers in Ireland over the past 50 years".

Personal life

Born in Inistioge, County Kilkenny, Keher was the second child born to Stephen and Noreen Keher (née Browne). His father, a member of the Garda Síochána, was a native of Donamon and had played Gaelic football for Roscommon, before later lining out with Kilkenny.

Keher learned the art of hurling at the local national school in Inistioge. Regular evening matches were played between Inistioge's "up streets" and "down streets", or between children from the village and the surrounding countryside. In 1952 the eleven-year-old Keher played for the school when they won the under-14 Roinn B championship. He added a second medal to his collection in 1955, when he was also named player of the match.

After completing his Leaving Certificate at St. Kieran's College, Keher later went to Ross's College in Dublin where he studied to be a bank official. He subsequently worked in the Allied Irish Bank branches in St. Stephen's Green and Capel Street in Dublin. Keher later transferred to the bank's branch in Kilkenny before becoming manager of the AIB branch in Callan, County Kilkenny.

Keher was a founder-member of the No Name Club along with Fr. Tom Murphy, Bobby Kerr and Éamonn Doyle. The organisation was established in 1978 and is devoted to providing alternative venues to public houses for young people and which now has about 30 branches across the country. Keher remains an active member of the No Name Club.

Career statistics

Inter-county

Inter-provincial

Honours

Team

Player

St. Kieran's College
All-Ireland Colleges' Senior Hurling Championship (2): 1957, 1959 (c)
Leinster Colleges' Senior Hurling Championship (3): 1957, 1958, 1959 (c)

Rower–Inistioge
Kilkenny Senior Hurling Championship (1): 1968

Kilkenny
All-Ireland Senior Hurling Championship (6): 1963, 1967, 1969 (c), 1972, 1974, 1975
Leinster Senior Hurling Championship (10): 1963, 1964, 1966, 1967, 1969 (c), 1971, 1972, 1973, 1974, 1975
National Hurling League (3): 1961–62, 1965–66, 1975–76
Leinster Minor Hurling Championship (4): 1956 (sub), 1957, 1958, 1959

Leinster
Railway Cup (9): 1964, 1965, 1967, 1971, 1972, 1973, 1974, 1975, 1977

Coach

Kilkenny
All-Ireland Senior Hurling Championship (1): 1979
Leinster Senior Hurling Championship (1): 1979

Individual

Honours
Hurling Team of the Millennium: Left corner-forward
Hurling Team of the Century: Left corner-forward
Kilkenny Hurling Team of the Century: Left corner-forward
The 125 greatest stars of the GAA: No. 5
Texaco Hurler of the Year: 1972
All-Star Awards (5): 1971, 1972, 1973, 1974, 1975
Cú Chulainn Awards (4): 1963, 1964, 1966, 1967
GAA Hall of Fame Inductee: 2013
 Scoring Record:211 goals 1426 points (2059 points) in 298 matches (League, Championship etc.) with Kilkenny.
 Leading Annual Scorer for 11 years 1963 to 1976

References

1941 births
Living people
All-Ireland Senior Hurling Championship winners
Kilkenny hurling managers
Kilkenny inter-county hurlers
Leinster inter-provincial hurlers
Rower-Inistioge hurlers